Deborah Fahy Bryceson is a British academic currently affiliated to the Centre of African Studies (CAS) at the University of Edinburgh and University of Uppsala. She pioneered research into sectoral change in Africa, looking primarily at 'transnational families' and coining the terms 'de-agrarianisation' and 'mineralized urbanization'. She has published 16 books and over 130 journal articles and book chapters, specialising on livelihood, labour, urbanization and agrarian studies.

Early life and education 
Born in the United States, Bryceson moved to Tanzania in 1971, where she obtained a BA and MA in Geography at the University of Dar es Salaam. She obtained a DPhil (Sociology) at the University of Oxford on African food insecurity.

Academic career 
Bryceson was a Senior Research Fellow at the Afrika-studiecentrum in Leiden between 1992 and 2005, which maintains a small archive of documents obtained during her research for her first publication, Food Insecurity and the Social Division of Labour in Tanzania.

Following her departure from the Africa-studiecentrum in Leiden, Bryceson took up the roles of Senior Lecturer and Reader at the Universities of Birmingham (2003–2004), Glasgow (2009–2013), respectively. Bryceson also consulted with various international agencies, including the ILO, World Bank, Dutch Ministry of Foreign Affairs and the then UK Department for International Development (now the Foreign, Commonwealth & Development Office).

Deborah Bryceson's main topics of study focus on the transformation of social and economic life in Sub-Saharan Africa. Bryceson's contributions to the field are found across the range of her publications – with her most notable being the definition of the concepts of 'de-agrarianization', 'transnational families' and 'mineralized urbanization'.

Publications 

 Bryceson, Deborah Food Insecurity and the Social Division of Labour in Tanzania, 1919–1985. 1990. London: Macmillan
 Bryceson, Deborah Liberalizing Tanzania's Food Trade: Public & Private Faces of Urban Marketing Policy 1939–1988. 1993. London: James Currey Publishers
 Bryceson, Deborah et al. Women Wielding the Hoe: Lessons from Rural Africa for Feminist Theory and Development Practice. (ed.) 1995. Oxford: Berg Publishers
 Bryceson, Deborah & Jamal, Vali Farewell to Farms: De-agraianization and Employment in Africa (ed.) 1997. Aldershot: Ashgate
 Bryceson, Deborah, Kay, Cristobal & Mooij, Jos Disappearing Peasantries? Rural Labour in Africa, Asia and Latin America (ed.) 2000. London: Intermediate Technology Publications
 Bryceson, Deborah Alcohol in Africa: Mixing Business, Pleasure and Politics (ed.) 2002. Portsmouth, NH: Heinemann
 Bryceson, Deborah & Banks, Leslie Livelihood, Linkages and Policy Paradoxes (ed.) 2001. Special Issue of the Journal of Contemporary African Studies 19(1)
 Bryceson, Deborah & Vuorela, Ulla The Transnational Family: New European Frontiers and Global Networks (ed.) 2002. Oxford: Berg Press
 Bryceson, Deborah & Potts, Deborah African Urban Economies: Viability, Vitality or Vitiation? (ed.) 2006. London: Palgrave Macmillan
 Bryceson, Deborah, Okely, Judith & Webber, Jonathan Identity and Networks: Fashioning Gender and Ethnicity across Cultures (ed.) 2007. Oxford: Berghahn
 Bryceson, Deborah, Havnevik, Kjell, Birgegård, Lars-Erik, Matondi, Prosper, Beyene, Atakilte African Agriculture and The World Bank: Development or Impoverishment?  (ed.) 2007. Uppsala: Nordic Africa Institute 
 Bryceson, Deborah, Grieco, Margaret, Ndulo, Muna, Porter, Gina & McCray, Talia Africa, Transport and the Millenium Development Goals (ed.) 2009. Newcastle: Cambridge Scholars Publishing 
 Bryceson, Deborah et al. How Africa Works: Occupational Change, Identity and Morality (ed.) 2010. London: Practical Action Publishers 
 Bryceson, Deborah & MacKinnon, Danny Mining & Urbanisation in Africa: Population, Settlement and Welfare Trajectories (ed.) 2012. Abingdon, UK: Routledge 
 Bryceson, Deborah, Fisher, Eleanor, Jonsson, Jesper Bosse, Mwaipopo, Rosemarie Mining & Social Transformation in Africa: Mineralising and Democratising Trends in Artisanal Production (ed.) 2014. Abingdon, UK: Routledge 
 Bryceson, Deborah Transnational Families in Global Migration: Navigating Economic Development and Life Cycles across Blurred and Brittle Borders (ed.) 2019. Special Issue of the Journal of Ethnic and Migration Studies 45(16) 
 ‘Domestic Work’, in Bellucci, S. and A. Eckert (eds). 2019. General Labour History of Africa: Workers,  Employers and Governments 20th-21st Centuries. Geneva, International Labour Office, 301-333. DOI: 10.2307/j.ctvd58sjm.18.
 'Handbook of Transnational Families around the World'. (edited by Javiera Cienfuegos, Rosa Brandhorst and Deborah Fahy Bryceson) 2023. London: Springer/Taylor Francis. ISBN: 978-3-031-15278-8.

References 

American Africanists
1951 births
Living people
University of Dar es Salaam alumni
Alumni of the University of Oxford
Academics of the University of Birmingham
Academics of the University of Edinburgh
Academic staff of Uppsala University
Academic staff of Leiden University